Andrew Dermot Harman Orr is an Irish Anglican priest. He has been  Archdeacon of Ossory and Leighlin since 2014.

Orr was born in 1966, educated at Queen's University, Belfast and ordained in 1992. His first post was a curacy at Ballymacash. After that he held incumbencies at Castlecomer, Castleknock and Tullow.

References

1966 births
Living people
Archdeacons of Ossory and Leighlin
Alumni of the University of Sheffield